Parting of the Waters is an unusual hydrologic site at Two Ocean Pass on the Great Divide, within the Teton Wilderness area of Wyoming's Bridger-Teton National Forest. Two Ocean Pass separates the headwaters of Pacific Creek, which flows west to the Pacific Ocean, and Atlantic Creek, which flows east to the Atlantic Ocean. In the marshy area of Two Ocean Pass adjacent to Parting of the Waters, water actually covers the Continental Divide such that a fish could swim from the Pacific Ocean to the Atlantic Ocean drainages. In fact, it is thought that this was the pass that provided the route for Yellowstone cutthroat trout to migrate from the Snake River (Pacific) to Yellowstone River (Atlantic) drainages.

This site received designation as a National Natural Landmark in 1965, bearing the official name of Two Ocean Pass National Natural Landmark.

Inasmuch as North Two Ocean Creek splits into streams that flow separately to the Atlantic and Pacific Oceans, the entire drainage of North Two Ocean Creek lies within an area that makes up the "Continental Divide" at this place.

See also
 List of unusual drainage systems
 Divide Creek, in the Canadian Rocky Mountains

References

External links
 Fs.fed.us
 Nature.nps.gov
 Parting of the Waters
 (looking downstream) Panoramio.com
 (looking upstream) Panoramio.com

Great Divide of North America
Bridger–Teton National Forest
Protected areas of Teton County, Wyoming
River bifurcations

de:Parting of the Waters